Perpheres is a genus of butterflies in the family Lycaenidae. It is monotypic containing only Perpheres perpheres (H. H. Druce and Bethune-Baker, 1893) endemic to New Guinea.This species was previously in Danis.

References
Druce, H.H. & Bethune-Baker, G.T. 1893. A monograph of the butterflies of the genus Thysonotis. Proceedings of the Zoological Society of London 1893(3): 536–552, pls. 45-47
Parsons, M. 1999 The butterflies of Papua New Guinea: their systematics and biology. San Diego: Academic Press. 

Polyommatini
Lycaenidae genera